Following is a list of all Article III United States federal judges appointed by President Thomas Jefferson during his presidency. In total Jefferson appointed 19 Article III federal judges, including 3 Justices to the Supreme Court of the United States, 7 judges to the United States circuit courts, and 9 judges to the United States district courts. Three of Jefferson's circuit court appointments were to seats that had been created by the Midnight Judges Act, signed by John Adams to allow the appointment of many of his supporters in the closing days of his administration. The service of these judges, including those appointed by Jefferson, terminated on July 1, 1802, due to the repeal of the Act and the accompanying abolition of the court.

Two of Jefferson's appointees, William Cranch (whom Jefferson elevated to Chief Judge of the Circuit Court of the District of Columbia) and Henry Potter (appointed first to the Fifth Circuit, and then to the District of North Carolina) served into the 1850s. Potter's 55 years on the latter court remains the longest period of active service in United States federal court history.

United States Supreme Court justices

Circuit courts

District courts

See also
Marbury v. Madison (1803)
Stuart v. Laird (1803)
United States v. More (1805)

Notes

References
General

 

Specific

Sources
 Federal Judicial Center

Judicial appointments
Jefferson

Thomas Jefferson-related lists